Samantha (Sam) Harrison (born 29 August 1991) is a New Zealand field hockey player. She has competed for the New Zealand women's national field hockey team (the Black Sticks Women), including for the team at the 2010 Commonwealth Games and the 2012 Summer Olympics.

Career
Born in Whangarei to Steve and Zanna Harrison, Samantha is the second of three sisters, between Charlotte and younger sister Anita. Samantha attended Whangarei Girls' High School before moving to Diocesan School for Girls in Auckland in Year 11 (Form 5).

Harrison was first selected for the Black Sticks Women in June 2009, along with ten other players as the Black Sticks squad was overhauled following its last-place finish at the 2008 Beijing Olympics, joining her older sister Charlotte, who had been in the team since October 2005. She played her first official match for the Black Sticks on 3 July 2009, against Argentina in her hometown of Whangarei, as part of a series of games against Argentina and China.

She was part of the New Zealand team that played at the 2010 Commonwealth Games, winning a silver medal.  She then participated at the 2012 Summer Olympics, where New Zealand finished fourth.

, Harrison is studying psychology at the Auckland University of Technology on Auckland's North Shore.

In November 2012, Harrison was demoted from the Black Sticks national squad to the development squad for the 2013 year, after national coach Mark Hager felt she was suffering from burnout. At the time, Harrison spent three months in Cambridge, England, coaching hockey at The Leys School.

At the 2018 Commonwealth Games, Harrison was part of the New Zealand team that won the women's competition.

Despite Samantha being two years younger and three centimetres (1 in) taller than her sister Charlotte, once the two competed together for the Black Sticks, their similarities in appearance became apparent and were often mistaken for each other by commentators and match officials.

At club level, Harrison is a member of the Southern Districts Hockey Club, based in Papatoetoe, Auckland. In the National Hockey League, she is a member of the Auckland Fury women's team.

References

External links
 

1991 births
Living people
Field hockey players from Whangārei
People educated at Whangarei Girls' High School
New Zealand female field hockey players
Olympic field hockey players of New Zealand
Field hockey players at the 2010 Commonwealth Games
Field hockey players at the 2012 Summer Olympics
Commonwealth Games silver medallists for New Zealand
Commonwealth Games medallists in field hockey
Female field hockey midfielders
Female field hockey forwards
Commonwealth Games gold medallists for New Zealand
Field hockey players at the 2018 Commonwealth Games
20th-century New Zealand women
21st-century New Zealand women
Medallists at the 2010 Commonwealth Games
Medallists at the 2018 Commonwealth Games